Alex Jordan Minter (born September 2, 1993) is an American professional baseball pitcher for the Atlanta Braves of Major League Baseball (MLB).  He played college baseball at Texas A&M University. Minter was drafted by the Braves in the second round of the 2015 MLB draft. He made his MLB debut in 2017.

High school and college
Minter attended Brook Hill School in Bullard, Texas, and was drafted by the Detroit Tigers in the 38th round of the 2012 Major League Baseball draft. He did not sign and attended Texas A&M University, where he played college baseball. After the 2014 season, he played collegiate summer baseball with the Cotuit Kettleers of the Cape Cod Baseball League. After spending his first two years pitching out of the bullpen, Minter was converted into a starting pitcher his junior year. Early in his junior season he suffered an injury which required Tommy John surgery, ending his season.

Professional career

Minter was drafted by the Atlanta Braves in the second round of the 2015 MLB draft. He made his professional debut in 2016 for the Rome Braves. He spent two stints with the Carolina Mudcats and was promoted to the Mississippi Braves in July, where he finished the season. Minter finished 2016 with a 1.30 ERA in  innings. Minter began 2017 with the Florida Fire Frogs and was reassigned to Rome, the Mississippi Braves, and the Gwinnett Braves during the season.

Minter was called up to the major leagues for the first time on August 23, 2017. In 26 relief appearances for Florida, Rome, Mississippi, and Gwinnett prior to his call up he was 1–2 with a 3.33 ERA. He made his major league debut that night, in the eighth inning of a game against the Seattle Mariners. Minter spent the remainder of the 2017 season with Atlanta, pitching to a 0–1 record and 3.00 ERA in 15 innings in which he struck out 26 batters. 

In 2018, Minter pitched  innings over 65 games, saving 15, while recording a 3.23 ERA and 69 strikeouts. 

Following a fender-bender motor vehicle incident in March, the start of Minter's 2019 season was delayed. Minter replaced fellow reliever Arodys Vizcaíno as closer due to injury, but lost the role to teammate Luke Jackson by late April. Minter was optioned to the Gwinnett Braves on May 10. He returned to Atlanta in June, then was optioned to Gwinnett for a second time in August as the Braves traded for Shane Greene, Chris Martin, and Mark Melancon. Minter ended the season as a September call-up when rosters expanded, but shortly thereafter was placed on the 60-day disabled list. 

For the 2019 season with the Braves, he was 3–4 with five saves and a 7.06 ERA in 36 relief appearances, in which he struck out 35 batters in 29.1 innings.

Minter started the 2020 season at spring training with the major league team, and was optioned to Gwinnett in March. In Game 5 of the 2020 NLCS, Minter made history by becoming the first MLB player ever to make their starting debut in the postseason. He pitched three innings, surrendering only one hit while striking out seven batters, also a record. 

In 2020 he was 1–1 with an 0.83	ERA, with 24 strikeouts in 21.2 innings over 22 relief appearances.

On July 18, 2021, Minter was optioned to Triple-A Gwinnett following the Braves 7-5 loss to the Tampa Bay Rays.

In 2021 with Atlanta he was 3-6 with a 3.78 ERA in 61 games. The Braves finished with an 88-73 record, clinching the NL East, and eventually won the 2021 World Series, giving the Braves their first title since 1995.

On January 13, 2023, Minter signed a one-year, $4.2875 million contract with the Braves, avoiding salary arbitration.

References

External links

1993 births
Living people
Sportspeople from Tyler, Texas
Baseball players from Texas
Major League Baseball pitchers
Atlanta Braves players
Texas A&M Aggies baseball players
Cotuit Kettleers players
Rome Braves players
Carolina Mudcats players
Mississippi Braves players
Florida Fire Frogs players
Gwinnett Braves players
Gwinnett Stripers players